A list of films produced in Argentina in 1965:

External links and references
 Argentine films of 1965 at the Internet Movie Database

1965
Films
Lists of 1965 films by country or language